Markham is a small village in the South Wales Valleys in Caerphilly County Borough, to the northeast of Bargoed. The B4511 road links to Markham from Aberbargoed and joins the A4048 road to the north of Argoed. The Sirhowy River flows to the east of the village. The village's population was around 1,495 people in 2011.

History
The area was formerly known as "Berllan Llwyd" and this name appears on tithe maps until the twentieth century. The name would seem to mean "The Grey/Brown Orchard" and was also the name of a farm whose land the modern village was built on. The modern Miners Institute and Welfare Club occupy the site of the farm buildings.

The nature of the area was dramatically changed when the Markham Steam Coal Company opened Markham Colliery in 1913. The mine cost £600,000 to sink, but the company also planned and built a new village which would house around 1,000 workers. This village quickly became known as Markham by both Welsh and English speakers. The planned village was seen as an attractive place to live, as exemplified by the often stated belief that Markham was the first mining village to have a bath in every property.

Markham Institute was funded by the colliery workers and built in 1928 on land formerly belonging to the Berllan-Llwyd farm. Today Markham is a district of the community of Argoed.

Landmarks
At the heart of the village is an active  Congregational Chapel. It celebrated its centenary in 2016. A Welfare Hall was built during its time as a mining village, which also housed a cinema. Today the hall is still used as a Social Club.

The village's primary school, Markham Primary School, is a feeder school for Blackwood Comprehensive School.
Markham RFC currently play in the WRU Swalec League Five South East. Markham RFC have won the Cyrus Davies Cup three times. They have also been semi-finalists of the Worthington Districts Cup three times.

Notable people from Markham

 Gerwyn Price — 2021 World Champion and three-time Grand Slam of Darts champion and the first Welshman to win a PDC televised major. He is a 6-time major champion and the number one player in the world according to the rankings as of September 2022.

 Matthew Webley - Founder of Wootzoo. A social media platform for parents, clubs and coaches.

References

Villages in Caerphilly County Borough
1913 establishments in Wales